Ahla is a village and Union council of Mandi Bahauddin District in the Punjab province of Pakistan. Ahla is situated on the southern bank of Lower Jhelum canal, about 9 km from Mandi Bahauddin city. It is located at an altitude of 202 metres (666 ft) from the sea level. Ahla is headquarters of Union council Ahla. It has a railway station by its name, located almost 3 km from the village.

References 

Villages in Mandi Bahauddin District
Union councils of Mandi Bahauddin District
Union councils of Punjab, Pakistan